Manny Mantrana (September 28, 1964 – April 21, 2021) was an American college baseball coach, formally serving as the UTRGV Vaqueros baseball head coach. He held that position since prior to the 2009 season, when the program was known as the Texas–Pan American Broncs and represented the University of Texas–Pan American (UTPA).

In 2015, UTRGV entered into operation after the merger of UTPA with the nearby University of Texas at Brownsville. The UTPA athletic program was inherited by UTRGV, and Mantrana kept his position through the merger. He then became the women's golf temporary head coach for UTRGV in the fall of 2017. On May 24, 2017, he announced that he was stepping down as Coach, with Mantrana being tapped to serve as a Special Assistant to the Director of Athletics.

He died on April 21, 2021, following a battle with cancer.

Playing career
After graduating from Miami Jackson High School, Mantrana attended Miami Dade for one season.  He then transferred to Middle Georgia, where he helped the Warriors to the 1983 NJCAA World Series.  He earned was named to the All-Tournament team and was MVP of the regional tournament while Middle Georgia finished second in the tournament.  He then played two seasons at LSU for Skip Bertman.  Although Mantrana had been drafted several times previously (after high school and three times during junior college), he was not drafted at the end of his collegiate career.  He signed a professional contract with the Detroit Tigers.  He played three seasons in Class A in the Tigers and New York Mets organizations before ending his playing career.

Coaching career
Mantrana began his coaching career at Miami Jackson High School, where he served for four seasons before moving to Miami Dade as an assistant.  After one year, he earned the head coaching job at St. Thomas.  In his twelve seasons with the NAIA Bobcats, the team appeared in the postseason nine times and earned three NAIA World Series berths.  Over 95% of his players earned their degrees, and at least 25 went on to play professionally.  He compiled a record of 434–193–1.  He was honored as Southeasat Coach of the Year and Florida Sun Conference Coach of the Year three times each.

He became head coach at Texas–Pan American for the 2009 season, and led them into the Great West Conference, going 52–58 in conference play in four seasons. With the dissolution of that league, the Broncs moved to the Western Athletic Conference, remaining in that league through the merger that created UTRGV. In four seasons with the WAC, he went 40–61–1 in conference play.

Head coaching record

References

External links

1964 births
2021 deaths
Baseball players from Miami
Sports coaches from Miami
Columbia Mets players
Fayetteville Generals players
Gastonia Tigers players
High school baseball coaches in the United States
LSU Tigers baseball players
Miami Dade Sharks baseball players
Miami Dade Sharks baseball coaches
Middle Georgia Warriors baseball players
St. Lucie Mets players
St. Thomas Bobcats baseball coaches
UT Rio Grande Valley Vaqueros baseball coaches